Zabulon may refer to:

 Zebulun, biblical founder of a tribe of Israelites
 Sabulon, an ancient city, former bishopric and present Latin Catholic titular see 
 the Zabulon skipper, Poanes zabulon, (alias southern dimorphic skipper), a North American butterfly
 Zabulon (Night Watch), a fictional character in the World of Watches
 Zabulon, English translation for the city of Cabul in northern Palestine